Ida Børresen  (born 26 September 1950) is a Norwegian civil servant.

Early life 
Børresen was born in Oslo, and is educated as cand.polit.

Career 
Børresen was assigned to the Ministry of Justice from 1982 to 1990. She served as deputy under-secretary of state (ekspedisjonssjef) from 1998 to 2005, and assisting under-secretary of state (assisterende departementsråd) 2005–06, in the Ministry of Church Affairs, Education and Research.
She was appointed director of Utlendingsdirektoratet from 2006 to 2012, and managing director of the Storting from  2012 to 2018.

In February 2018 she announced her resignation as managing director of the Storting.

References

1950 births
Living people
Civil servants from Oslo
Directors of government agencies of Norway